Emmerson Mnangagwa is the third and current President of Zimbabwe since 24 November 2017. Previously, he served as Vice-President of Zimbabwe from 2014 to 2017, and in various cabinet portfolios before that. Mnangagwa was a member of the Parliament of Zimbabwe from 1985 to 2015.

Parliamentary elections

1985 election

1990 election

1995 election

2000 election

2005 election

2008 election

2013 election

Speaker of Parliament election, 2000

Presidential election, 2018

See also 

 Elections in Zimbabwe

References 

Emmerson Mnangagwa
Mnangagwa, Emmerson